The Sleeping Father is a novel by Matthew Sharpe first published in 2003 about an average middle-class American family struck by betrayal, separation, and illness. In particular, it is about the coming of age of the two teenage members of the family despite, or rather through, the troubles that befall them.

Wisecracking his way through life until he has eventually reached adulthood, 17-year-old Chris Schwartz has provoked comparison with Holden Caulfield, the protagonist of Salinger's novel The Catcher in the Rye.

Plot summary

The Schwartzes live their ordinary lives in the aptly named (and fictional) small town of Bellwether, Connecticut. When she thinks her two children do not need her any longer, Lila Schwartz, a sexually active woman, leaves behind her family, calls herself Lila Munroe and moves to California, where she trains, and later works, as a lawyer. Faced with the dual challenge of having to raise two teenage kids while remaining successful in his demanding job as a publicist and speech writer, Bernard Schwartz more and more relies on medication to cope with everyday life. The real trouble begins when he accidentally swallows two incompatible antidepressants and falls into a coma shortly thereafter.

While he is unconscious Bernard Schwartz has a stroke. When he wakes up again he is seriously handicapped—his speech is slurred, his walk is unsteady and his memory is permanently impaired. Similar to a child, he has to learn the meanings of many words. Instead of going to school, Chris teaches his father as best as he can.

In spite of his enforced preoccupation with his "sleeping" father, Chris Schwartz notices that his own life goes on without any major change. Still a virgin, he fantasizes about having sex with Lisa Danmeyer, Bernard's neurologist and actually has his first sexual encounter ever at his father's rehab centre with a sexy speech pathologist who performs fellatio on him.

At the same time Cathy, his 16-year-old sister, is on the brink of abandoning her Jewish roots and converting to Roman Catholicism. However, she also develops a crush on Francis Dial, her brother's best friend and classmate. Chris cannot believe that his younger sister might have sex before he does, but in the end this is exactly what happens, an unwanted teenage pregnancy being the result of their union. At first the young lovers are unsure whether Cathy should have an abortion or not, but Cathy soon makes up her mind to keep the baby.

Characters in The Sleeping Father
Chris Schwartz – protagonist
Cathy Schwartz – Chris's sister
Bernard Schwartz – father to Chris and Cathy
Lila Schwartz – mother to Chris and Cathy, who leaves home and changes her name to "Munroe"
Lisa Danmeyer – Bernard's neurologist
Francis Dial – friend to Chris and Cathy

Main themes
The Sleeping Father also discusses the issues of racism (Francis Dial is African American), crime, and violence against women (at a battered wives' shelter, Cathy meets a woman whose husband is a violent criminal who, towards the end of the novel, robs the Schwartzes at gunpoint).

See also

Bildungsroman

External links
Discussion questions

2003 American novels

Novels set in Connecticut